Red Star Football Club is a football club from Anse-aux-Pins, Seychelles. It originated in 1993 after the dissolution of the merger between Anse-aux-Pins FC and St Michel United FC. The club plays in the Seychelles Second Division. It has been crowned champions of Seychelles on two occasions.

Achievements
Seychelles League: 2
 1998, 2001

Seychelles FA Cup: 4
 1995, 1996, 1999, 2004

Performance in CAF competitions
CAF Champions League: 1 appearance
2002 – Preliminary Round

Stadium 
Currently the team plays at the 10,000 capacity Stade Linité.

References

External links

Football clubs in Seychelles